Sabina Yasmin Mita Noor (known as Mita Noor; died 1 July 2013) was a Bangladeshi actress. On 1 July 2013, she committed suicide by hanging herself at her home in Gulshan, Dhaka.

Career
As a child, Noor attended Bulbul Lalitakala Academy to learn Bharatnatyam. She debuted in 1989 with weekly drama Sagar Sechar Swadh on Bangladesh Television. She also took part as a model in TV advertisements.
In 2011 she directed one short play Chowngali.

Personal life
Noor was married to businessman Shahanur Rahman Majumder for 24 years. Together they had two sons - Shehzad Noor Taus and Sadman Noor Tahmud. Taus was on the news when he had created the first-ever Bangladeshi meta-search engine SearchW3.net at the age of 13.

Death
On 1 July 2013, after a history of depression, Noor committed suicide by hanging herself at her home in Gulshan, Dhaka.

References

1970s births
2013 deaths
Suicides by hanging
Bangladeshi television actresses
Year of birth missing
Place of birth missing
2013 suicides
Suicides in Bangladesh